This is a list of seaports in Mexico.

Atlantic Ocean (Gulf of Mexico and Caribbean Sea)

Pacific Ocean (including the Gulf of California) 

Mexico's 10 busiest freight ports by total cargo tonnage.

References

Geography of Mexico
 
Mexico